Jean Ellen Taylor (born 1944) is an American mathematician who is a professor emerita at Rutgers University and visiting faculty at the Courant Institute of Mathematical Sciences of New York University.

Biography
Taylor was born in Northern California. She did her undergraduate studies at Mount Holyoke College, graduating summa cum laude with an A.B. in 1966. She began her graduate studies in chemistry at the University of California, Berkeley, but after receiving an M.Sc. she switched to mathematics under the mentorship of Shiing-Shen Chern and then transferred to the University of Warwick and received a second M.Sc. in mathematics there. She completed a doctorate in 1973 from Princeton University under the supervision of Frederick J. Almgren, Jr.

Taylor joined the Rutgers faculty in 1973, and retired in 2002. She was president of the Association for Women in Mathematics from 1999 to 2001.

She has been married three times, to mathematicians John Guckenheimer and Frederick Almgren, and to financier and science advocate William T. Golden.

Research
Taylor is known for her work on the mathematics of soap bubbles and of the growth of crystals. In 1976 she, along with Almgren, published the first proof of Plateau's laws, a description of the shapes formed by soap bubble clusters that had been formulated without proof in the 19th century by Joseph Plateau. Encyclopedia Britannica called the mathematical derivation "one of the major triumphs of global analysis".

Awards and honors
Taylor is a fellow of the American Academy of Arts and Sciences, the American Association for the Advancement of Science, the American Mathematical Society, and the Society for Industrial and Applied Mathematics. In 2001, she received an honorary doctorate from Mount Holyoke College. In 2017, she was selected as a fellow of the Association for Women in Mathematics in the inaugural class.

Selected publications
.
.
.
.
.
.
.

References

External links
 
 Home page at Rutgers

Living people
20th-century American mathematicians
1944 births
Women mathematicians
Mount Holyoke College alumni
University of California, Berkeley alumni
Alumni of the University of Warwick
Princeton University alumni
Rutgers University faculty
Fellows of the American Academy of Arts and Sciences
Fellows of the American Mathematical Society
Fellows of the American Association for the Advancement of Science
Courant Institute of Mathematical Sciences faculty
Fellows of the Society for Industrial and Applied Mathematics
Fellows of the Association for Women in Mathematics
21st-century American mathematicians